Jocelyn Rico (born 17 December 1959) is a French former professional footballer who played as a right-back and defensive midfielder. From 1978 to 1993, he made 383 appearances in the first two tiers of football in France.

International career 
Rico was an Olympic international for France. He was called up by the team's manager for a friendly tournament in China in June 1983, but was not chosen for the Summer Olympics in Los Angeles the following year.

Personal life 
Born in Concarneau, Brittany, Rico's parents were Pieds-Noirs from Morocco. His brother Robert is also a former professional footballer, and played for the France national team.

Following his retirement from professional football, Rico became a coach. He coached an under-13 side of US Saint-Grégoire while he played for the club's senior team. Rico was employed by the town of Saint-Grégoire as an educator, and coached several other youth teams in the area. He also worked as a sports equipment manager for the town.

Honours 
Brest

 Division 2: 1980–81
US Saint-Grégoire

 Coupe de Bretagne: 1998

References 

1959 births
Living people
People from Concarneau
Footballers from Brittany
Sportspeople from Finistère
French footballers
Association football fullbacks
Association football midfielders
US Concarneau players
Stade Brestois 29 players
OGC Nice players
Paris Saint-Germain F.C. players
AS Cannes players
Stade Rennais F.C. players
Ligue 2 players
Ligue 1 players
Championnat National 3 players